The Indian Ambassador to the Bhutan is the chief diplomatic representative of India to the Bhutan, housed in Thimpu.

List of Indian Ambassadors to Bhutan
The following officers have served as Ambassadors of India to Bhutan.

References 

 
India
Bhutan